Songololo is a town in Kongo Central Province in the Democratic Republic of the Congo.

Transport
It is served by a station of the national railway system on the line between the ocean port and the capital of Kinshasa.

See also
 Railway stations in DRCongo

References

Populated places in Kongo Central